Lucy Mary Cavanagh (1871–1936) was an American botanist and plant collector, noted for her identification of several species of bryophytes.

Works

References 

1871 births
1936 deaths
19th-century American botanists
19th-century American women scientists
20th-century American botanists
20th-century American women scientists